Juliano is a masculine given name. Notable people with the given name include the following:

Footballers
Juliano Silva Almeida (born 1994), Brazilian footballer known as Juliano
Juca (footballer, born 1979) nickname for Juliano Roberto Antonello (born 1979), Brazilian footballer
Juliano Belletti (born 1976), Brazilian footballer
Juliano Chade (born 1998), Brazilian footballer known as Juliano
Juliano Rangel de Andrade (born 1982), Brazilian football
Juliano de Paula (born 1981), Brazilian footballer
Juliano André Pereira da Silva (born 1986), Brazilian footballer known as Juliano
Juliano Laurentino dos Santos (born 1985), Brazilian footballer known as Roma 
Juliano Pescarolo Martins (born 1974), Brazilian footballer known as Paquito
Juliano Mineiro (born 1986), Brazilian footballer
Juliano Real Pacheco (born 1990), Brazilian footballer known as Juliano 
Juliano Gomes Soares (born 1983), Brazilian footballer known as Juliano
Juliano Spadacio (born 1980), Brazilian footballer
Juliano Vicentini (born 1981), Brazilian footballer

Other athletes
Juliano Fiori (born 1985), Brazilian rugby player
Juliano Máquina (born 1993), Mozambican boxer
Juliano Moro (born 1977), Brazilian racing driver

Arts
Juliano Cazarré (born 1980), Brazilian actor
Julianos Kattinis, Greek painter 
Juliano Mer-Khamis (1958 – 2011), Israeli Jewish/Palestinian Arab actor, director, filmmaker, and political activist
Juliano Ribeiro Salgado (born 1974), Brazilian filmmaker, director, and writer
Juliano Son (born 1973), Brazilian Christian singer, songwriter, missionary and worship pastor

Other
Juliano Moreira (1872 – 1933), Afro-Brazilian psychiatrist

See also

Giuliano
Giulio
Guliano Diaz
Julian (name)
Julio (given name)

Masculine given names